Pherbellia cinerella is a species of fly in the family Sciomyzidae. It is found in the  Palearctic . P. cinerella is a dark and very characteristic Pherbellia and easy to recognise in the field by its long mid-frontal stripe and darkened anterior wing margin. The larva is predatory on a variety of terrestrial and aquatic snails including Helicidae, Galba truncatula, Helix, Helicella, Succinea and Lymnaea.There is little or no host preference. It is found in a wide range of habitats but it is most often found in warm and dry habitats such as coastal dunes and calcareous grassland where it can reach high numbers. It is also encountered in moist vegetation though in lesser numbers. It is a potential biological control agent.

References

External links
Images representing Pherbellia cinerella at Barcode of Life Data Systems

Sciomyzidae
Insects described in 1820
Muscomorph flies of Europe